Caryocolum oculatella is a moth of the family Gelechiidae. It is found in Austria and Switzerland.

The length of the forewings is 5-5.5 mm. The forewings are dark brown to blackish, but the dorsal margin is lighter and speckled brown. Adults have been recorded on wing from late June to early July.

The larvae feed on Gypsophila repens. They feed between spun terminal shoots.

References

Moths described in 1930
oculatella
Moths of Europe